Ramat Denya (Hebrew: רמת דניה) (lit. "Denya Heights") is a neighborhood in southwest Jerusalem. It was established in 1970 between Kiryat Hayovel and Bayit Vegan, 780 meters above sea level. Denya was the name of the development company that built the first apartment buildings.

Streets
The streets in Ramat Denya are named for: Abel Pann (1887–1963), an artist and teacher at the Bezalel Academy of Art and Design; Aryeh (Louis) Kobovy (1896–1966) a Labor Zionist leader in Belgium and Israeli consul to Poland and Czechoslovakia; Zeitlin in memory of two brothers, Hillel (1872–1943), a philosopher and researcher of Hasidism who was killed by the Nazis, and Aharon (1898–1973), a writer and poet; Edward Gelber (1904–1971), a Canadian Zionist leader who emigrated to Israel in 1954 and his wife Hanna a notable physician and a WIZO leader in Israel; Yosef Haim Shrim (1851–1949), rabbi of the Syrian Jewish community; Zvi Leibowitz (1897–1980), a Jerusalem municipal planner who oversaw the transport of supplies to Jerusalem during the siege of 1948.

Notable residents
Shlomo Hillel 
Yotam Ottolenghi - chef and TV presenter

References

Neighbourhoods of Jerusalem